Kelser is a surname. Notable people with the surname include:

Raymond Alexander Kelser (1892–1952), US Army veterinary bacteriologist
Ryan Kesler (born 1984), American ice hockey player
Greg Kelser (born 1957), American basketball player and color commentator

See also
Elser
Kelsey (surname)
Kesler